The Heist is a 1989 HBO made-for-TV movie, starring Pierce Brosnan.

Cast
 Pierce Brosnan as Neil Skinner
 Tom Skerritt as Ebbet Berens
 Wendy Hughes as Sheila
 Noble Willingham as Stuckey
 Tom Atkins as Det. Leland
 Robert Prosky as Dancer
 Stephen Apostolina as Ramirez
 Ben Mittleman as Tall goon
 Nino Surdo as Short goon
 Shelton Redden as Cave
 Roger Hewlett as Durfee
 Joseph Carberry as Kelso
 Chino 'Fats' Williams as Fats
 Art Frankel as Wolscott

External links

1989 television films
1989 films
American television films
American heist films
1980s American films